The BMW M30 is a SOHC straight-six petrol engine which was produced from 1968 to 1995. With a production run of 27 years, it is BMW's longest produced engine and was used in many car models.

The first models to use the M30 engine were the BMW 2500 and 2800 sedans. Larger displacement versions were introduced over time, with the largest version being , which was sometimes badged as "3.5 litres". As per the BMW M10 four-cylinder engine from which the M30 was developed, the M30 has an iron block, an aluminium head and an overhead camshaft with two valves per cylinder.

The engine was given the nicknames of 'Big Six' and 'Senior Six', following the introduction of the smaller BMW M20 straight-six engine in the late 1970s. The M30 was produced alongside the M20 throughout the M20's production, and prior to the introduction of the BMW M70 V12 engine in 1987, the M30 was BMW's most powerful and largest regular production engine.

Following the introduction of the BMW M50 engine in 1990, the M30 began to be phased out.

Ward's have rated the M30 as one of the "Top Engines of the 20th Century".

Design
The M30 was originally developed in the late 1960s, loosely based on the BMW M10 four-cylinder engine first used in the BMW New Class sedans and coupes. Initially, the engine code was "M06" and the "M68", until all versions began to use the "M30" prefix in 1981.

Common features between the M10 and M30 include a profile lowering 30-degree slant to the right, a crossflow cylinder head (a gas flow head in later designs) and chain-driven camshaft with rocker arm valve actuation. Further similarities include a cast-iron block with an aluminium head and a forged crankshaft.

M30B35LE/M90 engine

The M30B35LE engine, also called the M90, was used in several models from 1979-1982. It combines the block from the motorsports BMW M88 DOHC engine with the M30's SOHC cylinder head.

Versions

M30B25V 

The first  version of the M30 was introduced in the 1968 E3 2500. This version uses dual Solex Zenith 35/40 INAT carburettors, has a compression ratio of 9.0:1 and produces  in most applications.

The M30B25 has previously been called the M06 and M68, prior to BMW retroactively renaming it the M30B25V (V for Vergaser- carburettor in German).

Applications:
 1968–1977 E3 2500
 1974–1975 E9 2.5 CS
 1973–1976 E12 525 — , Solex 4A1 carburettor
 1976–1981 E12 525
 1977–1979 E23 725

M30B25 
In 1981, Bosch L-Jetronic electronic fuel injection was added to the  version.

Applications:
 1981-1987 E28 525i
 1981-1986 E23 725i

M30B28V 
The specifications went on to vary depending on the model year, carburettor and country.

This version has also been known as the M06 and M68, prior to BMW renaming it the M30B28V.

Applications:
 1968-1977 E3 2800 / 2.8L — 
 1968-1971 E9 2800 CS — 
 1971-1971 E3 Bavaria — , United States only
 1974-1976 E12 528 —  dual Zenith INAT carburettors
 1976-1978 E12 528 — , Solex 4A1 carburettor
 1977-1979 E23 728 — , Solex 4A1 carburettor

M30B28 
In 1977, Bosch L-Jetronic electronic fuel injection was added to the  version.

 1977-1978 E12 528i — North America only, 9.0:1 compression ratio
 1978-1981 E12 528i — 
 1979-1986 E23 728i
 1979-1987 E24 628CSi
 1981-1987 E28 528i

M30B30V 
In United States trim, this engine produced  at 5800 rpm.

Applications:
 1971-1975 E9 3.0 CS
 1971-1972 E9 3.0 CSL
 1971-1974 E3 3.0 S / 3.0 L / Bavaria
 1976-1979 E24 630 CS — , Pierburg 4A1 carburetor
 1977-1979 E23 730 — , Solex 4 A 1 carburettor

M30B30 
The fuel injected version of the  M30 debuted in 1971 in the E9 3.0 CSi and initially used the Bosch D-Jetronic mechanical fuel injection system. In 1976, the fuel injection system was upgraded to Bosch L-Jetronic electronic fuel injection. The compression ratio is 9.2:1. With catalytic converter, compression ratio is 9:1.

Applications:
 1971-1975 E9 3.0 CSi — 
 1972-1973 E9 3.0 CSL — 
 1972-1975 E3 3.0 Si — 
 1975-1978 E12 530i — North America only, 
 1976-1976 E12 530 MLE — South Africa only, 
 1977-1978 E24 630CSi — North America only, 
 1986-1995 E32 730i — 
 1988-1990 E34 530i —

M30B32 
The compression ratio is 8.8:1. In the E24 633CSi coupe, the M30B32 uses Bosch L-Jetronic electronic fuel injection. The US version used L-Jetronic from 1978 until mid-1981, changing over to Motronic digital fuel injection in June of that year. The 1979 732i is BMW's first use of Bosch's Motronic fuel injection.

Applications:
 1973-1975 E9 3.0 CSL — , 
 1976-1984 E24 633CSi —  in Euro spec,  in USA spec
 1976-1979 E3 3.3 Li — 
 1977-1984 E23 733i —  in Euro spec,  in USA spec
 1979-1981 E12 533i — North America only, 
 1979-1986 E23 732i — 
 1982-1984 E28 533i — North America only, 
 1984-1986 E30 333i — South Africa only,

M30B33V 

Applications:
 1973-1975 E3 3.3 L

M30B34 
The M30B34 engines sold in Europe and most other markets used a 10.0:1 compression ratio and produced . In North America and Japan, the M30B34 used an 8.0:1 compression ratio and produced . This engine was also offered in Europe from the latter half of 1985 until mid-1987. In all markets, the Bosch Motronic digital fuel injection system was used.

Applications:
 1982-1987 E23 735i / L7
 1982-1987 E24 635CSi / L6 —  in Euro spec
 1985-1988 E28 535i / 535is / M535i

M30B35

Applications:
 1988-1989 E24 635CSi
 1986-1992 E32 735i
 1987-1992 E34 535i
 1988-1989 Rayton Fissore Magnum 3.5

Turbocharging
The M30 was the basis for the turbocharged M102 and M106 engines.

The Alpina B10 Biturbo used a modified version of the M30, with two turbochargers and forged pistons. The final 50 M30 blocks were shipped to Alpina for use in the final 50 B10 Biturbos.

M102
The M102 was produced from 1980 to 1982. It was BMW's first turbocharged six-cylinder engine.

The KKK K27 turbocharger produces  of boost and an air-to-air intercooler is used. The compression ratio is 7.0:1.

The M102 produces  and was used in the E23 7 Series, in the model was designated "745i". The M102 was not available in right-hand drive cars, leading to the South African 745i using the BMW M88 naturally aspirated DOHC straight-six engine instead.

Applications:
 1980–1982 E23 745i

M106
The M106 (also called M30B34MAE) replaced the M102 and was produced from 1982 to 1986.

Some of the M106's upgrades over its predecessor are a result of the M30B34 version of the M30, which was also released in 1982. The compression ratio was increased from 7.0:1 to 8.0:1.

There was no direct successor to the M106, however BMW's next turbocharged petrol engine was the BMW N54, introduced in 2006.

Applications:
 1982-1986 E23 745i

Motorsport

The M30 powered a series of E9 CSL and E24 6 Series coupes to European Touring Car Championship (ETCC) throughout the 1970s and into the middle 1980s, even though a more powerful DOHC 24-valve head had been developed for high-performance motorsports and street use.

The BMW M88 high-performance engine is based on the M30 block.

See also 

 BMW
BMW M10, the four-cylinder engine that the M30 was based on.
BMW M20, the smaller straight-six engine which was sold alongside the M30 for many years.
BMW M88, the high-performance, DOHC, straight-six engine that was sold alongside the M30 from 1978-1989
BMW S38, the catalyzed version of— and ultimately the successor to— the M88, which was sold alongside the M30 from 1986-1995.
 List of BMW engines

References

M30
Straight-six engines
Gasoline engines by model